Wabash Valley Power Association is an electric generation and transmission cooperative headquartered in Indianapolis, Indiana. Wabash Valley provides wholesale power to 23 distribution cooperatives in Illinois, Indiana, and Missouri that reach over 311,000 businesses and residences. The cooperative operates under the business model of the National Rural Electric Cooperative Association.

Wabash Valley is a member of the PJM Interconnection and the Midcontinent Independent Transmission System Operator and a founding member of Touchstone Energy.

Wabash Valley's generating facilities make use of landfill gas generation, natural gas, coal, biogas, solar and wind power. Their program for members to purchase energy from renewable sources is monickered EnviroWatts. Co-op Solar is also available through participating distribution members. Through Wabash Valley Power's dist. In May 2009, Wabash Valley's Renewable Energy Certificate was certified by Green-e Energy.

Wabash Valley Power Association was founded in Peru, Indiana in 1963 by five distribution cooperatives. Their membership grew over the years and the headquarters were relocated to Indianapolis in 1976.

Members
 Boone REMC
 Carroll White REMC
 Citizens Electric Corporation
 Corn Belt Energy
 EnerStar Electric Cooperative
 Fulton County REMC
 Heartland REMC
 Hendricks Power Cooperative
 Jasper County REMC
 Jay County REMC
 Kankakee Valley REMC
 Kosciusko REMC
 LaGrange County REMC
 M.J.M. Electric Cooperative
 Marshall County REMC
 Miami-Cass REMC
 Newton County REMC
 NineStar Connect
 Noble REMC
 Parke County REMC
 Steuben County REMC
 Tipmont REMC
 Warren County REMC

References

External links
 Official website

Electric generation and transmission cooperatives in the United States
American companies established in 1963 
Energy companies established in 1963 
Companies based in Indianapolis
1963 establishments in Indiana